Hofstetter is a German surname. Notable people with this surname include the following:

 Daniel Hofstetter (born 1992), German footballer
 Edwin Hofstetter (1918–2006), American politician
 Hugo Hofstetter (born 1994), French cyclist
 Mario Richard Hofstetter, designer of the Hofstetter Turbo car
Rachell Hofstetter (also known as Valkyrae) (born 1992), American YouTuber and streamer
 Roman Hoffstetter or Hofstetter (1742–1815), German monk and composer
 Steve Hofstetter (born 1979), American author, columnist and comedian

German-language surnames